Winchester Highlands station was an MBTA Commuter Rail Lowell Line station located at Cross Street in the northern part of Winchester, Massachusetts. It originally opened in the mid-19th century under the Boston and Lowell Railroad (B&L) as a flag stop called North Winchester. In 1877, a local real estate developer constructed a new station building, which was renamed Winchester Highlands. The B&L became part of the Boston and Maine Railroad (B&M) in 1887. Service to the station gradually decreased in the 20th century, and the depot was replaced by a wooden shelter around 1943. The Massachusetts Bay Transportation Authority (MBTA) began subsidizing service on the line in 1965. Winchester Highlands and two other stations with low ridership were closed by the MBTA in June 1978.

History

Boston and Lowell Railroad
The Boston and Lowell Railroad (B&L) opened between its namesake cities in 1835. Most intermediate stations were added by 1850, though some were added later when demand arose. North Winchester station, a flag stop with a smaller wooden shelter, was opened by 1864. North Winchester was a tiny village with just 14 houses at that time, and the station was not always listed in timetables. The shelter was on the west side of the tracks just south of Cross Street.

In the 1870s, residents of Winchester Highlands petitioned the B&L for a new station building, but the railroad was not willing to bear the cost. Aaron C. Bell, a local real estate developer, constructed a two-story house on the west side of the tracks north of Cross Street. The upper level served as the station (as the tracks were on an embankment); the lower level housed the station agent and his family. The station was built on land belonging to Eli Cooper, who had been the engineer of the first train to run on the B&L. It was believed to be the only privately owned railroad station on the line.

Bell affixed a gilded wooden bell emblem engraved with the 1877 construction date to the station. It was dedicated on December 31, 1877, at which time the station was renamed as Winchester Highlands. Despite the name change, the station was still commonly known as North Winchester into the 1880s. A church prayer group (which later became the Second Congregational Church of Winchester) held meetings in the station from 1881 until their own chapel was completed in 1887. The original shelter was extant until at least 1889.

Boston and Maine Railroad

The B&L became part of the Boston and Maine Railroad (B&M) in 1887 as its Southern Division. Most local service was routed over the nearby Woburn Loop after its 1885 completion, so Winchester Highlands station only saw limited service. It was served by six daily round trips in 1917 (mostly peak-hour Stoneham Branch and  locals), with a slight reduction by 1929. Twenty-four passengers were injured when a southbound train from Concord derailed near the station on May 23, 1923. The train's consist of newer steel cars, rather than older wooden cars, was credited with preventing deaths.

The bell was torn off the building by a storm in January 1935. It was brought to the office of a local newspaper, and later presented to the Winchester Historical Society. The bridge over Cross Street adjacent to the station was rebuilt in 1939. The station building was replaced with a small shelter around 1943 to reduce the B&M tax bill. The old building was demolished. Stoneham Branch service ended on May 18, 1958, after which Winchester Highlands was served by  trains.

MBTA
The B&M sold the Winchester Highlands station lot, as well as the Winchester and  station buildings, in 1964. The Massachusetts Bay Transportation Authority (MBTA) was created that year to subsidize suburban commuter rail service. Subsidies for a number of B&M lines, including the Southern Division service as far as Wilmington, began on January 18, 1965. Subsidies for all Lowell service began on June 28; it became the Lowell Line of the MBTA Commuter Rail system. In 1967, the MBTA proposed to modernize Winchester Highlands as a park and ride facility. 

Cross Street station had just 13 daily boardings in a 1972 count; all walked to the station, as no parking was available. By that time, only a single inbound trip and two outbound trips were scheduled to stop at Winchester Highlands. The B&M commuter rail assets were purchased by the MBTA on December 27, 1976. The shelter built in 1943 is no longer extant.

References

External links

MBTA Commuter Rail stations in Middlesex County, Massachusetts
Buildings and structures in Winchester, Massachusetts
Former MBTA stations in Massachusetts
Railway stations closed in 1978